Gareth S. Armstrong (born 25 June 1948) is a British actor, director, teacher and writer.

Career
Armstrong began his career by acting in school plays at the Bishop Gore School, Swansea. At the age of 16 he joined the National Youth Theatre; and went on from there to study drama at Hull University. 

On stage he has played leading roles in most of the UK's regional theatres including Birmingham Rep., Nottingham Playhouse and the Bristol Old Vic where parts ranged from Mamet to Molière. He has specialised in Shakespearean theatre where roles have included Romeo, Richard III, Oberon, Macbeth, Shylock and Prospero. He has also toured to over fifty countries and all over the United States with his own one-man show Shylock, in which Shakespeare's principal Jewish character is seen from the viewpoint of Tubal, the Bard's only other male Jewish character and Shylock's only friend in the original play. The play has won awards in New Zealand, Canada, Spain and Germany and been translated into Catalan, Spanish, Italian, French and Russian as well being performed on Dutch television and Romanian radio. As a member of the Royal Shakespeare Company he worked in Stratford and London and has performed in the West End in plays by Noël Coward, Tom Stoppard, Agatha Christie and most recently in Yes, Prime Minister (2013). He played at Shakespeare's Globe in 2008, 2010, and 2011.

As a director he was a founder of "The Made in Wales Stage Company", an Artistic Director of Cardiff's Sherman Theatre and an Associate Artist at the Salisbury Playhouse. As a freelance he has directed all over the UK, as well as in Europe, and the United States. He has more recently specialised in directing solo shows, which include "My Darling Clemmie" by Hugh Whitemore and performed by Rohan McCullough, "Sherlock Holmes- The Last Act" by David Stuart Davies, performed by Roger Llewellyn, and Shakespeare's "The Rape of Lucrece" performed by Gerard Logan which won the Edinburgh Fringe 'Stage Award' for Best Solo performance in 2012. He and Logan also collaborated on Armstrong's dramatisation of Oscar Wilde's 'De Profundis' in the play called "Wilde Without The Boy". His most recent production of Hugh Whitemore's play "Sand in the Sandwiches" stars Edward Fox as the poet John Betjeman and is programmed to tour the UK and play at London's Haymarket Theatre.

In 2004 he published his account of presenting his solo play in A Case for Shylock – Around the World with Shakespeare's Jew. His most recent book "So You Want To Do A Solo Show", an instructional book for professional actors, is published by Nick Hern Books. In 2015 he wrote a five-handed comedy called "Fondly Remembered" which premiered in London and is now published by French's Acting Editions,

He has lectured and taught on campuses across the US and taken workshops and masterclasses in India, Sri Lanka New Zealand, Italy and all over the UK. He has been a guest director at the Royal Central School of Speech and Drama and at the Bristol Old Vic Theatre School.  He is an Examiner in Speech and Drama for Trinity College London.

Armstrong's television credits include: Z-Cars, Doctor Who (in the serial The Masque of Mandragora), Blake's 7, The Professionals, Terry and June, One Foot in the Grave, Casualty and EastEnders and Birds of a Feather.

Armstrong provided the voice for the character of Sandy in the Japanese television series Saiyūki, released in English-speaking countries as Monkey. He has recorded hundreds of audiobooks and has embarked on recording all of George Simenon's "Maigret" novels for Audible. For Black Library he has narrated novels and audio dramas at Games Workshop.

On radio, Armstrong has played three recurring roles in The Archers on Radio 4, including Sean Myerson, the publican of the Cat and Fiddle and the serial's first regular gay character. He also starred in an episode of Fear on Four, titled 'The Edge', which was first broadcast in 1991.

References

External links
 

1948 births
Welsh male television actors
Living people
British male Shakespearean actors
Male actors from Swansea
People educated at Bishop Gore School
National Youth Theatre members
20th-century Welsh male actors
21st-century Welsh male actors